Renato Motroni known as Bob Motroni (1917-1984) was a Scottish international lawn bowler.

Bowls career
Motroni became the British singles champion after winning the British Isles Bowls Championships in 1969. He was a shopkeeper by trade and played for the Dumfries Bowls Club. He also won two Scottish National Bowls Championships, the singles in 1969 and the pairs in 1965.

Motroni competed in the 1970 Commonwealth Games and was the only player to defeat the legendary David Bryant in the singles tournament.

References

1917 births
1984 deaths
Scottish male bowls players
Bowls players at the 1970 British Commonwealth Games
Commonwealth Games competitors for Scotland
Italian emigrants to the United Kingdom